Alathyria profuga is a species of freshwater river mussel, a bivalve mollusk in the family Hyriidae. This species occurs in coastal rivers in eastern New South Wales, Australia. The type specimen was collected from the Hunter River.

References

Hyriidae